American alternative rock band Lifehouse has released seven studio albums, three extended plays, one DVD, and sixteen singles. The band's debut single, "Hanging by a Moment", was named Billboards song of the year in 2001. After signing to DreamWorks Records in 2000, the band released their debut studio album, No Name Face, which has been certified 2× Platinum by the RIAA.

The band released their latest album Out of the Wasteland on May 26, 2015.

Albums

Studio albums

Compilation albums

DVDs
Everything (2005)

Extended plays

Singles

Promotional singles

Other songs

Music videos

Notes

References

Discographies of American artists
Rock music group discographies